The Ireland men's national pitch and putt team represents Ireland in the pitch and putt international competitions. It is managed by the Pitch and Putt Union of Ireland (PPUI).

It was one of the founder members of the European Pitch and Putt Association, the governing body that develops the pitch and putt in Europe and stages the European Team Championship. Ireland has won the 5 European Championships. Also in 2006 the Pitch and Putt Union of Ireland created the Federation of International Pitch and Putt Associations (FIPPA), that stages the World Cup Team Championship. Ireland won the World Cup in 2008.

National team

Players
National team in the European Championship 2010
Ray Murphy
John Walsh
William Sheridan
Chris Scannell
Kieron Dunscombe
Eddie Carey

National team in the World Cup 2008
Paul O'Brien
Raymond Murphy
Derek Courtney

National team in the European Championship 2007
Ray Murphy
Liam O'Donovan
Derek Courtney
Paul O'Brien
William Buckley
Sean Downes

See also
World Cup Team Championship
European Team Championship

External links
PPUI Pitch and Putt Union of Ireland
FIPPA Federation of International Pitch and Putt Associations website
EPPA European Pitch and Putt Association website

National pitch and putt teams
Pitch and putt